Mix Brasil is the biggest Brazilian LGBT site on web.
 
Mix Brasil was formed in 1993 and in the following year, by the same organizers and bearing the same name, one of the most important Brazilian GLBTT Internet portals of pop Queer information was formed.
MixBrasil is also a publishing house, responsible for Junior, lifestyle gay magazine.

Movie Festival

They co-ordinate too an internationally renowned Brazilian movie festival about human sexual diversity. The attractions count with a national competition of short films and exhibitions of international movies, everything with LGBT themes.

References

External links
 Festival Mix Brasil Home URL 
 Festival Mix Brasil da Diversidade Sexual
 

LGBT-related mass media in Brazil
LGBT-related websites